Muhtar is a given name and a surname. Notable persons with that name include:

Persons with the given name
 Muhtar Kent (born 1952), Turkish American businessman
 Ahmet Muhtar Merter (died 1959), Turkish freedom fighter-leader
 Celalettin Muhtar Ozden (1865–1947), Turkish dermatologist 
 Ahmed Muhtar Pasha (1839–1919), Turkish Ottoman grand vizier and general
 Ahmet Muhtar Bej Zogolli (1895-1961), eleventh Prime Minister of Albania, first President of Albania, and first fully recognized Albanian king.

Persons with the surname

 Mansur Muhtar (born 1959), Nigerian economist
 Reha Muhtar (born 1959), Turkish television personality

See also
 Mukhtar

Turkish-language surnames
Turkish masculine given names